Orgon (ancient: Urgonum, or Castrum de Urgone) is a commune in the Bouches-du-Rhône department in the Provence-Alpes-Côte d'Azur region in Southern France. In 2019, it had a population of 2,821. It is located on the departmental border with Vaucluse, which follows the river Durance.

Geography
Neighbouring villages and small towns include Les Baux-de-Provence, Saint-Rémy-de-Provence and Cavaillon. Orgon is one of the twelve communes of the Alpilles area, a small mountain chain made famous through the paintings of Vincent van Gogh and novels of the French author Alphonse Daudet. The river Durance runs through it.

Demographics
In 1923 the commune of Plan-d'Orgon was created from part of Orgon.

Sights
The village of Orgon harbours a 19th-century monastery overlooking the Durance valley (Notre Dame du Beauregard) and the ruins of a Templar castle.

History
In history, Orgon is known through the attempted lynching of Napoleon Bonaparte on his way to Saint Helena passing through the village. Orgon was also the birthplace of the French poet Antoine Pomme (1620) and the painter Louis Espérandieu (1787-1857).

Ecology
Having given its name to a specific type of limestone found only in this area, the recent plans of extension of the mining activities of the company OMYA in Orgon have led to protest actions by French intellectuals throughout the country, worried about the risks to the preservation of the natural and historic specificities of Alpilles hills. The dispute regarding the extension plans of the multi-national mining company OMYA have to an extent come to an end through the announced nomination of the territory as a protected Regional Parc as of January 1, 2007.

See also
 Communes of the Bouches-du-Rhône department

References

External links

 Tourism office website 

Communes of Bouches-du-Rhône
Bouches-du-Rhône communes articles needing translation from French Wikipedia